Harry Young (October 29, 1882 – February 11, 1946) was a Canadian cyclist. He competed in two events at the 1908 Summer Olympics.

References

External links
 

1882 births
1946 deaths
Canadian male cyclists
Olympic cyclists of Canada
Cyclists at the 1908 Summer Olympics
Place of birth missing